The tifa, tiwa or tiva is a single-headed goblet drum used throughout the Maluku Islands of Eastern Indonesia, where it is traditionally the "dominant instrument" in Maluku province music. The term tifa has been used outside of the Maluku Islands, including on the island of Java and on the island of New Guinea, in Indonesia's Papua province.

Where the Maluku-tradition tifas tend to be unadorned or plain, the Papua-province tifas tend to be decorated with patterns and symbols, which may be ethnic or spiritual in nature.

Forms
With two overall traditions, Papuan and Maluku, there are two basic forms for the tifa drums. Papua hourglass drums tend to be more slender and often have a handle. They are played with the empty hand. Some of them are made from lenggua wood ("thick and strong".) The drumhead is made from deerhide or lizard skin.

The Maluku tifa is more of a tubular drum without a handle. It varies in size, and may use a woven rattan rope with badeng pegs to tension the drumhead, which is made of goat skin. It may be played with empty hands or from a drumstick made from sago palm fronds, coconut fronds, rattan or gaba-gaba (sections of long sago palms 60-100 cm long).

Maluku tradition, drums with heads attached with rattan harness

Papua tradition: hourglass drums with heads glued on
See Kundu (drum)

Hourglass drums with glued on drumheads. Where the tifas with heads attached by rattan are associated with the Maluku Islands, these drums are associated with New Guinea and nearby islands. Related to the Papua New Guinean kundu. To the extent which the New Guinea instruments are close to the kundu, they also fall within Melanesian musical tradition.

One Papua tifa that uses rattan on the drumhead is the hourglass drum made by the Asmat people. The Asmat glue down the drumhead, then slip a tight fitting ring of rattan over the edges to keep the glued edge of the skin head in place. Traditionally, the lizard skin was held in place with a layer of human blood (as glue).

Customs
The tifa has traditionally been played by men, and this custom has resisted modern attitudes of equality between men and women. Adherence to gender roles is seen as a way to honor ancestors. In rural communities, older values dictate the role of the male musician is to be a leader.  His role is to "play ritual music," the rituals of which are seen as a "cultural and hereditary heritage from their ancestors." When played for ritual use, the community procedures dictate getting permission to play.

In Papua, one occasion to play the tifas is a Sing-sing, a gathering of a few tribes or villages in Papua New Guinea. People arrive to show their distinct culture, dance and music. The aim of these gatherings is to peacefully share traditions as each Islands have their own dance. Villagers paint and decorate themselves for sing-sings which they only have once a year. The male-exclusive role of drummers has been relaxed in some places, such as Raja Ampat Islands, where photos show women playing the Maluku-style tifas in suling tamborf (flute drum) ensembles. (See gallery, Malaku traditions.)

The Maluku tifa is used to accompany "traditional ceremonies, traditional dances and war dances," including the Cakalele dance. The Cakalele dance recalls the "atmosphere of war in ancient Maluku society." The Maluku tifa is also combined with totobuang gong chimes to form a tifa totobuang ensemble to accompany Maluku Island's Sawat Lenso dance. The Sawat Lenso joins a form or instrumental ensemble used by Christians with Sawat music and dance brought by Muslims.

Names

See also
Kundu (drum), the drum from Papua New Guinea
 Tifa, article on Indonesian Wikipedia

References

External links
Page with photo of large Papuan-style tifa drums (or possibly kundus).
Page with Papuas-style tifa or kundu, about 6 feet long.
Video: a tifa totobuang ensemble playing in an indoor setting, showing both totobuang chimes and tifa drums.
Video: a tifa totobuang ensemble playing in an outdoor setting, showing both totobuang chimes and tifa drums.

Indonesian musical instruments
Papua New Guinean musical instruments
Membranophones